The Rhubarb Triangle is a  area of West Yorkshire, England between Wakefield, Morley and Rothwell famous for producing early forced rhubarb. It includes Kirkhamgate, East Ardsley, Stanley, Lofthouse and Carlton. The Rhubarb Triangle was originally much bigger, covering an area between Leeds, Bradford and Wakefield.

Rhubarb is native to Siberia and thrives in the wet cold winters in Yorkshire. West Yorkshire once produced 90% of the world's winter forced rhubarb from the forcing sheds that were common across the fields there.

In 2010, Yorkshire Forced Rhubarb was awarded Protected Designation of Origin (PDO)
status by the European Commission’s Protected Food Name scheme after being recommended by Department for Environment, Food and Rural Affairs (Defra).

Cultivation

The cultivation method for forced rhubarb was developed in the early 1800s. The fields were fertilised with large quantities of horse manure and 'night soil' from the nearby urban areas and woollen waste from "mungo and shoddy" mills.

The rhubarb plants spend two years out in the fields without being harvested. While in the fields the plants store energy from the sun in their roots as carbohydrates. The roots are subjected to frost before being moved into sheds in November where they are kept in complete darkness. In the sheds the plants begin to grow in the warmth and the stored carbohydrate in the roots is transformed into glucose resulting in forced rhubarb's sour-sweet flavour. The sheds are long low buildings which are heated; originally with coal, which was plentiful and relatively cheap in the area, but this has been replaced by diesel.

Forced rhubarb grown in the sheds is more tender than that grown outdoors in summer. Traditionally, the pickers pull the stalks in candlelight as any exposure to strong light will stop the growth. By the end of March the harvest is over and the root stock is totally exhausted and used for compost.

History 
Growing and forcing rhubarb was originally done by many hundreds of small farmers, smallholders and market gardeners. In later years some growers expanded and owned many thousands of roots and extensive forcing sheds. In the late 19th century early forced rhubarb was sent to Spitalfields and Covent Garden markets in London in time for Christmas and was sent to Paris for the French market.  A special express train carrying rhubarb was run by the Great Northern Railway Company from Ardsley station every weekday night during the forced rhubarb season from Christmas until Easter. Up to 200 tons of rhubarb sent by up to 200 growers was carried daily at the peak of production before 1939. In 1962, a rail strike caused the growers to look for alternative transport and the service ended shortly after. Wakefield Museum has a permanent exhibition about forced rhubarb. Rhubarb became less popular after the Second World War when more exotic fruits became more available.

The Oxford English Dictionary dates the name "rhubarb triangle" to a 1965 textbook mentioning pre-war trains called rhubarb specials that ran from the West Riding rhubarb triangle to London and it was mentioned in the Guardian newspaper in 1986.

EU recognition of Yorkshire forced rhubarb

Twelve farmers who farm within the Rhubarb Triangle applied to have the name "Yorkshire forced rhubarb" added to the list of foods and drinks that have their names legally protected by the European Commission's Protected Food Name scheme. The application was successful and the farmers in the Rhubarb Triangle were awarded Protected Designation of Origin status (PDO) in February 2010. Food protected status accesses European funding to promote the product and legal backing against other products made outside the area using the name. Other protected names include stilton cheese, champagne and parma ham. Leeds Central MP, Hilary Benn, was involved in the Defra campaign to win protected status.

Culture
Wakefield Council holds an annual Rhubarb Festival in February, celebrating the area's links and promoting the surviving rhubarb industry. A Farmers' Market, cookery demonstrations, walks and tours of the forcing sheds are among the attractions. In 2005 Wakefield council  erected a sculpture depicting a rhubarb plant in Holmfield Park Wakefield. Rhubarb growing and the 'Rhubarb Express' are featured in Wakefield Museum.

In Frances Brody's 2019 novel The Body on the Train a murdered man's body is found on a rhubarb train from Ardsley, on its arrival at King's Cross. The book's cover illustration features boxes of rhubarb on a platform beside a train.

See also
 Rhubarb forcer

References
Notes

Citations

Bibliography

External links

Rhubarb Sheds; images from Leodis
E. Oldroyd & Sons Ltd
 Asquith Growers
Yorkshire Film Archive (documentary): The Rhubarb Triangle (2000) 

British products with protected designation of origin
Geography of the City of Bradford
Geography of Leeds
Rhubarb
Rothwell, West Yorkshire